Tagir Akhmedovich Musalov (born 9 February 1994) is a Russian-Azeri professional footballer.

Club career
He made his professional debut in the Russian Professional Football League for FC Anzhi-2 Makhachkala on 12 August 2014 in a game against FC Alania Vladikavkaz.

He made his debut for the main squad of FC Anzhi Makhachkala on 20 September 2017 in a Russian Cup game against FC Luch-Energiya Vladivostok.

Personal life
He is the twin brother of Magomed Musalov.

References

External links
 Career summary by sportbox.ru

1994 births
People from Tsumadinsky District
Twin sportspeople
Living people
Russian footballers
Association football forwards
Russian sportspeople of Azerbaijani descent
Azerbaijani expatriate footballers
Azerbaijani footballers
FC Anzhi Makhachkala players
Sportspeople from Dagestan